The Marmolada Glacier is located on the mountain Marmolada in the  province of Trentino, Italy.

Geography 

Marmolada Glacier is the only one in the Dolomites section of the Alps. During World War I, the front line between Austrian and Italian forces ran over Marmolada, and Austrian soldiers built quarters in glacier tunnels, forming an "ice city" of considerable size. A World War I museum, Museo della Grande Guerra in Marmolada, is located in the valley below the glacier.

Incidents 

On 3 July 2022, a serac collapse killed eleven mountaineers.

References

Glaciers of Italy
Geography of Trentino
Glaciers of the Alps
Marmolada